Berkley Island is an island, 1 km long, which marks the north-eastern end of the Swain Islands. It was first mapped from air photos taken by U.S. Navy Operation Highjump, 1946–47, and was included in a survey of the Swain Islands in 1957 by Wilkes Station personnel under Carl R. Eklund. It was named by Eklund for Richard J. Berkley, a geomagnetician with the US-IGY wintering party of 1957 at Wilkes Station.

Important Bird Area
The island, along with neighbouring Cameron Island, the intervening sea and smaller islets, has been identified as  a 97 ha Important Bird Area by BirdLife International because it supports some 14,000 pairs of breeding Adélie penguins (as estimated from January 2011 satellite imagery). It lies about 9 km east of Australia's Casey Station.

See also 
 Composite Antarctic Gazetteer
 List of Antarctic islands south of 60° S
 Scientific Committee on Antarctic Research
 Territorial claims in Antarctica

References

External links 

 
Important Bird Areas of Antarctica
Penguin colonies
Islands of Wilkes Land